, also known as 5-Tōbun no Hanayome, is a television anime series based on shōnen manga series written and illustrated by Negi Haruba. The second season's title is stylized as The Quintessential Quintuplets ∬.

The anime series is licensed in North America under Crunchyroll–Funimation partnership. A second season was announced in a special event for the first season on May 5, 2019. Kaori is replacing Satoshi Kuwabara as the director of the season, and Keiichirō Ōchi is returning to write the scripts. Bibury Animation Studios is replacing Tezuka Productions as the animation studio. The season was originally scheduled to premiere in October 2020, but due to issues caused by the COVID-19 pandemic, the anime was delayed to air from January 8 to March 26, 2021.

A sequel film, which serves as the finale of the anime, was released on May 20, 2022.



Episode list

Notes

References

External links

  
 

Anime postponed due to the COVID-19 pandemic
2021 Japanese television seasons
The Quintessential Quintuplets episode lists